Judith Rosemary (Sparks) Crawley (April 21, 1914 – September 16, 1986) was a Canadian film producer, cinematographer, director, and screenwriter. She and her husband Frank Radford "Budge" Crawley co-founded the production company Crawley Films in 1939.

Crawley is best known for writing the Academy Award-winning documentary The Man Who Skied Down Everest. She is considered to be the first Canadian female filmmaker, and is recognized as being a pioneer for women who work in the film industry.

Early life
Judith "Judy" Sparks was born in Ottawa, Ontario to Roderick Percy Sparks, a prominent tariff counsel and Rheba (Fraser) Sparks. She studied at the Ottawa Ladies' College, and later studying English and economics from 1933 to 1936, graduated from McGill University, having earned a Bachelor of Arts.

After her marriage to her next door neighbour,  "Budge" Crawley, on October 1, 1938, Crawley became interested in filmmaking.

Filmmaking career
Crawley wrote the script and edited Île d'Orléans (1938), the first film she worked on with her husband. Shot during their honeymoon, the film won the Hiram Percy Maxim Award from the Royal Canadian Geographical Society for Best Amateur Film in 1939, making their collaboration the first Canadian film to receive this type of recognition.

Crawley and her husband founded Crawley Films in 1939. As her family grew, Crawley became increasingly interested how to properly raise children. In 1947, she wrote, directed and starred in the educational childcare short film Know Your Baby. Despite its financial failure upon release, the film became immensely popular with audiences, and prompted two follow-up series commissioned by McGraw Hill.

From 1941 to 1944, after being hired by renewed Scottish documentary filmmaker John Grierson, Crawley became a freelance cinematographer, screenwriter, editor and director for the National Film Board of Canada (NFB), often working with her husband. During her time at the NFB, Crawley directed Four New Apple Dishes, the first NFB film to be directed by a woman.

As an independent filmmaker on contract to the  NFB, the Crawley's The Loon's Necklace (1950) "remains in the national collective unconscious of generations of Canadians.

In 1957, Crawley and her husband were given a joint Canadian Film Award.

After 1961, Crawley elected to focus on producing and writing rather than directing. As a result, Crawley wrote the script for The Man Who Skied Down Everest, which in 1975 won the Academy Award for Best Documentary Feature. This film was the first Canadian-made production to take home the Academy Award for Best Documentary .

After separating from her husband in 1965, Crawley founded another film production company with two of her children, Michal and Jennifer.

From 1979 to 1982, Crawley was the president of the Canadian Film Institute.

In 1986, Crawley and her husband received a joint Special Achievement Genie Award for their continued work in the Canadian film industry.

Death
On September 16, 1986, Crawley died from respiratory disease.

Partial filmography

References

Notes

Citations

Bibliography

 Armatage, Kay, Kass Banning, Brenda Longfellow and Janine Marchessault, eds. Gendering the Nation: Canadian Women's Cinema. Toronto: University of Toronto Press, 1999. .
 Khouri, Malek. Filming Politics: Communism and the Portrayal of the Working Class at the National Film Board of Canada, 1939-46. Calgary, Alberta, Canada: University of Calgary Press, 2007. .
 McInnes, Graham. One Man's Documentary: A Memoir of the Early Years of the National Film Board. Winnipeg, Manitoba: University of Manitoba, 2004. .
 Wise, Wyndham.  Take One's Essential Guide to Canadian Film. Toronto: University of Toronto Press, 2015. .

1914 births
1986 deaths
Businesspeople from Ottawa
Canadian film editors
Film producers from Ontario
Canadian women cinematographers
Canadian women film directors
Canadian women screenwriters
Canadian women film producers
Film directors from Ottawa
Canadian film production company founders
Canadian women film editors
Writers from Ottawa
20th-century Canadian screenwriters
20th-century Canadian women writers